The 1999 Women's Five Nations Championship was the first Women's Five Nations Championship and was won by , who achieved the Grand Slam.

Final table

Results

See also
Women's Six Nations Championship
Women's international rugby union

References

External links
The official RBS Six Nations Site

1999
1999 rugby union tournaments for national teams
1998–99 in Irish rugby union
1998–99 in English rugby union
1998–99 in Welsh rugby union
1998–99 in Scottish rugby union
1998–99 in French rugby union
rugby union
rugby union
rugby union
1998–99 in European women's rugby union
rugby union
rugby union
Women's Five Nations
Women's Five Nations
Women's Five Nations